Once More is the seventh and final studio album by English new wave band Spandau Ballet, released on 19 October 2009 by Mercury Records. The album includes 11 re-recordings from the band's back catalogue and two newly written songs. The first single, the title track "Once More", one of the two brand-new songs, was released as a promotional single on 5 October 2009 and as a digital download on the same day as the album was released. The album entered at number seven on the UK Album Chart on 25 October 2009.

Background
Once More is the first new recording by Spandau Ballet since 1989. Eleven of the thirteen tracks are re-recordings of previously recorded songs by the group. The first and the last track on the album, "Once More" and "Love Is All" are new songs written during the band's reunion. The title track is written by Gary Kemp and Steve Norman, while "Love is All" is the first Spandau Ballet song written by Tony Hadley. The album is produced by Danton Supple, who co-produced Coldplay's X&Y album.

Singer Tony Hadley said about the new recordings: "When we got back together and the tour dates went on sale, none of us could believe the fantastic reaction we got from fans and the press alike. When the opportunity came to get into a studio and play music together, we couldn't pass it up." Gary Kemp said about the title track that "the new song was a way for us to show that Spandau Ballet are back, not just to play the hits on tour but also to take on our contemporaries in the pop charts!"

The re-recordings of the eleven older songs are made in a semi-acoustic, unplugged-like style, which gives their songs a 21st-century flavour, according to sax player Steve Norman, taking them to some "very dark, different place". According to Gary Kemp the sound of the album is not only the sound of Spandau Ballet reinvented for the 21st century, but also "how we would have made these songs the first time around if we had the maturity and know-how to achieve it".

Track listing

Charts

Certifications

References

2009 albums
Albums produced by Danton Supple
Mercury Records albums
Spandau Ballet albums